Stewart, is a remote civil parish of Poole County in far North West New South Wales. Stewart is located 10 miles south of Cameron's Corner.

The Geography, of the parish is mostly the flat, arid landscape of the Channel Country. The parish has a Köppen climate classification of BWh (Hot desert). The County is barely inhabited with a population density of less than 1 person per 150 km² and the landscape is a flat arid scrubland.

History
The parish is the traditional lands of the Wadigali people, one of the speakers of a Yarli language.

Charles Sturt explored the area in 1845.

See also
 Stewart Parish, Killara County

References

Parishes of Poole County
Far West (New South Wales)